Cihang Zhenren is a Daoist deity who is identified with the Buddhist bodhisattva Guan Yin. Cihang Zhenren is one of the Three Great Immortals and became a bodhisattva because of his endless willingness and effort in helping those in need. 

In some Daoist records, Cihang Zhenren was said to one of the twelve disciples of Yuanshi Tianzun. In some Daoist temples, under the statute of Cihang Zhenren, there  usually is a golden lion with eight additional smaller heads, which is known as the Nine Headed Golden Lion.  It is said that the Immortal Cihang Zhenren can appear in the human realm in 32 different human forms (三十二应), some of which are male, others female.

There are three anniversaries of Cihang Zhenren that have been celebrated –  The first is on the nineteenth day of the Flower Moon (Lunar Second Month). This was the day Cihang Zhenren prayed for the dead to be liberated from hell and blessings for the living (other legends say it was his birthday). The second is on the nineteenth day of the Lychee Moon (Lunar Sixth Month). This was the day he subjugated Ningbo Xianzi (a sea spirit that caused maritime disasters) and successfully gained enlightenment. The third is on the nineteenth day of the Chrysanthemum Moon (Lunar Ninth Month). This was the day Cihang Zhenren achieved immortality.

Reference

External links 
 慈航真人, Chinese Taoist Association

Deities in Taoism
Chinese gods
Chinese mythology
Taoist immortals